Hybris (minor planet designation: 430 Hybris) is a typical Main belt asteroid.

It was discovered by Auguste Charlois on 18 December 1897 in Nice.

References

External links 
 
 

Background asteroids
Hybris
18971218
Hybris